Hinckley railway station serves the town of Hinckley and village of Burbage in Leicestershire, England.

The station is owned by Network Rail and managed by East Midlands Railway, who do not operate services from this station. Only CrossCountry operate trains from here.

A full range of tickets for travel is available from the station ticket office when it is open (0640—1300 hrs), or at other times from the guard on the train at no extra cost.

History
The station was opened in 1861 as part of the South Leicestershire Railway, which was taken over by the London and North Western Railway in 1867.

Services

Buses operate from outside the station around the town and also to Magna Park and Lutterworth. The station is also just a short walk from The Crescent bus station where a large number of services can be caught to farther destinations and also smaller nearby villages.

References

External links

Railway stations in Leicestershire
DfT Category E stations
Former London and North Western Railway stations
Railway stations in Great Britain opened in 1861
Railway stations served by CrossCountry
1861 establishments in England
Hinckley
Railway stations in Great Britain not served by their managing company